Megestrol caproate, abbreviated as MGC, is a progestin medication which was never marketed. It was developed in Russia in 2002. In animals, MGC shows 10-fold higher progestogenic activity compared to progesterone when both are administered via subcutaneous injection. In addition, MGC has no androgenic, anabolic, or estrogenic activity. The medication was suggested as a potential contraceptive and therapeutic agent.

Chemistry

Megestrol caproate, also known as megestrol 17α-caproate, as well as 17α-hydroxy-6-dehydro-6-methylprogesterone 17α-caproate or as 17α-hydroxy-6-methylpregna-4,6-diene-3,20-dione 17α-caproate, is a synthetic pregnane steroid and a derivative of progesterone and 17α-hydroxyprogesterone. It is the C17α caproate (hexanoate) ester of megestrol. Closely related medications include megestrol acetate (MGA; megestrol 17α-acetate), acetomepregenol (megestrol 3β,17α-diacetate), and cymegesolate (megestrol 17α-acetate 3β-cypionate). In addition to MGA, analogues of MGC include chlormadinone caproate, gestonorone caproate, hydroxyprogesterone caproate, medroxyprogesterone caproate, and methenmadinone caproate.

References

Abandoned drugs
Caproate esters
Dienes
Enones
Pregnanes
Progestogen esters
Progestogens
Russian drugs